Turrubares Hills Protected Zone, is a protected area in Costa Rica, managed under the Central Conservation Area, it was created in 1983 by law 6300 Art. 3.

References 

Nature reserves in Costa Rica
Protected areas established in 1983